Felixstowe College was a girls' independent school, located in Felixstowe, Suffolk.  It was established in 1929 and closed in 1994.  In 1995, a different school called Felixstowe International College was founded on part of the site of Felixstowe College.  Other former boarding houses, playing fields and the main school site were sold off for private housing.  Julie Welch's memoir Too Marvellous for Words covers her time spent at this school in the 1960s.

History
The school's original name was Uplands School.  It became Felixstowe Ladies' College in January 1929.  In the 1930s, the name changed to Felixstowe College for Girls, and then to Felixstowe College.

Houses
The main boarding houses were Cranmer, Latimer, Ridley and Tyndale. Wycliffe was the first year house (Lower IV).  Sixth form accommodation was located in Old Hooper, Coverdale and the Sixth Form Centre.

Year groups

Headmistresses
Miss M. E. Clarke 1929-1943
Miss Ruth Jones ("Jonah") 1943-1967
Miss Elizabeth Manners ("Maude") 1967-1979
Miss Dawn Guinness 1979-1988
Mrs Angela Lynas (Acting Headmistress) Autumn Term 1988
Mrs Ann Woodings 1989-1993
Mrs Bridget Patterson 1993-1994

Map of the site in 1979

Note: the location of Latimer House changed in 1982.

References

External links

Girls' schools in Suffolk
Defunct schools in Suffolk
Felixstowe
1929 establishments in England
Educational institutions established in 1929
1994 disestablishments in England
Educational institutions disestablished in 1994